Women Trafficking and Child Labour Eradication Foundation (WOTCLEF) is an anti-human trafficking organisation that attempts to stop human trafficking and child labor in Nigeria. WOTCLEF's areas of focus are: human trafficking, child labour, abuse of the rights of women and children and HIV/AIDS. The organisation helped create the National Agency for the Prohibition of Trafficking In Persons (NAPTIP) and the Network of Civil Society Organisation Against Child Trafficking, Abuse and Labour (NACTAL).

WOTCLEF was founded in 1999 by Amina Titi Atiku-Abubakar, the wife of Atiku Abubakar, a former vice president of Nigeria. It has since been campaigning against human trafficking in Nigeria and inspiring change in other African countries.

History

In 1986, as a postgraduate student, Titi Atiku saw human trafficking on the streets of Italy. This led to her fight against human trafficking. Upon her return to Nigeria, she tried to fight human trafficking, but she could not do much individually. She wanted to establish an anti-human trafficking organisation.

In 1999, her husband was sworn in as the Vice President of Nigeria and she took the opportunity to establish WOTCLEF. At the time, HIV/AIDS was the major issue being tackled by development partners in Nigeria, so WOTCLEF embarked on awareness campaigns against human trafficking to politicians. This informed Nigerians about human trafficking and its effects.

Every state in Nigeria had a WOTCLEF branch with workers who served as watchdogs against human trafficking.

Influence
WOTCLEF found out that the government must be involved in order to stop human trafficking. Its founder  wanted to establish a law against human trafficking. WOTCLEF was instrumental in the formation of the National Agency for the Prohibition of Trafficking in Persons. In 2001, after work by legal and policy experts led by Justice Mary Odili, the first lady of Rivers State, WOTCLEF presented a bill to the National Assembly which was passed and signed into law by then-president Olusegun Obasanjo. The signing led to the establishment of the NAPTIP, which has been in operation since 2003, helping victims and punishing traffickers while providing rehabilitation and support for trafficked people.

International Activities and partners
Apart from its national programs, WOTCLEF has carried out campaign activities in different Europeans countries and the US. The organization has collaborated with other organizations to rehabilitate victims of human trafficking.

WOTCLEF has partnered with the following national and international organizations:
 Care and Support Unit of the Federal Ministry of Labour and Productivity
 Nigerian Union of Road Transport Workers, International Labour Organization (ILO)/International Programme on the Elimination of Child Labour (IPEC). United Nations Children's Fund (UNICEF)
 International Organization for Migration (IOM)
 National Agency for Prohibition of Trafficking In Persons and other related matters (NAPTIP)
 National Council of Women's Societies
 European Union

Rehabilitation
The organization has treated over 500 cases of human trafficking and child labour by providing services such as food, shelter, and therapy. In 2015, WOTCLEF rehabilitated 20 trafficked victims within the age of 18 to 22.

References

External links

Human trafficking in Nigeria
Organizatons
Non-profit organizations based in Nigeria
Human rights organizations based in Nigeria
Youth organizations based in Nigeria